Agnes M. Scanlon (December 22, 1923 – October 3, 2018) was a Democratic member of the Pennsylvania House of Representatives.

References

1923 births
2018 deaths
Democratic Party members of the Pennsylvania House of Representatives
Women state legislators in Pennsylvania
21st-century American women